Goka Ramalingam (21 October 1921 – 1999) was an Indian politician who served in the Hyderabad Legislative Assembly and the successive Andhra Pradesh Legislative Assembly from 1952 until 1967. A member of the Indian National Congress, Ramalingam represented the Bhongir and Jangaon constituencies.

Political career 
In 1952, Ramalingam successfully ran as an Indian National Congress candidate for a by-election to the Hyderabad Legislative Assembly, defeating a member of the People's Democratic Front by less than 300 votes in the Bhongir constituency. Ramalingam succeeded Ravi Narayana Reddy of the PDF, who had been elected to the 1st Lok Sabha in the 1952 Indian general election. Following the reorganization of Hyderabad State into Andhra Pradesh in 1956, Ramalingam continued to represent the Bhongir constituency in the Andhra Pradesh Legislative Assembly, the successor to the Hyderabad Legislative Assembly. In the 1957 Andhra Pradesh Legislative Assembly election, Ramalingam was re-elected in the neighboring Jangaon constituency. He was re-elected again in the 1962 election.

In the 1967 election, Ramalingam ran for re-election in the neighboring Cheriyal constituency, a seat reserved for Scheduled Castes. He was defeated by Boddu Abraham of the Communist Party of India, receiving 12,735 compared to Abraham's 15,195, with K. Devadanam of the Swatantra Party placing third with 7,248. However, Ramalingam contested the election, claiming that because both Abraham and Devadanam had converted to Christianity, they were no longer members of a Scheduled Caste, as the Constitution (Scheduled Castes) Order, 1950 stated that only Hindus and Sikhs could be members of a Scheduled Caste, with Ramalingam thus claiming that Abraham and Devadanam were ineligible to have run in the Cheriyal constituency. On 21 August 1967, the Andhra Pradesh High Court ruled against Ramalingam and dismissed the case.

Ramalingam's younger brother Goka Ramaswamy was also an MLA, representing the Ghanpur Station constituency in the Andhra Pradesh Legislative Assembly, and serving as a cabinet minister from 1978 to 1982.

References 

Date of death missing
Place of death missing
Hyderabad State politicians
Andhra Pradesh MLAs 1957–1962
Andhra Pradesh MLAs 1962–1967
Indian National Congress politicians from Andhra Pradesh
Dalit politicians